Warstar may refer to:

 War hero or war star
 Warstar (comics), two aliens that serve as a member of the Shi'ar Imperial Guard (Marvel Comics)
 Universal Annihilation Army Warstar or "Warstar" (Uchū Gyakumetsu Gundan Wōsutā), the antagonists from Tensou Sentai Goseiger
 The Warstar Empire, an organization appearing in the TV series Power Rangers Megaforce
 Warstar (GY73), a trawler built in 1914 by Cook, Welton & Gemmell
 Guerre Stellari (literally  "War Stars"), the Italian release title for Star Wars

See also
 Military Star, Irish decoration
 Battlestar (disambiguation)
 Star Wars (disambiguation)
 Star (disambiguation)
 War (disambiguation)